Mian Kal or Meyan Kal or Miyan Kal or Mian Kol may refer to:
 Mian Kol, Gilan
 Mian Kal, Khuzestan